Jean-Eudes Dubé,  (November 6, 1926 – January 5, 2019) was a Canadian politician.

Dubé first ran for a seat in the House of Commons of Canada as a Liberal in a 1961 by-election, but was defeated in the New Brunswick riding of Restigouche—Madawaska. He was elected from the same riding in the 1962 general election, and was subsequently re-elected on five occasions. (From 1968 on, he was elected from the riding of Restigouche.)

Following the 1968 election, Dubé joined the Cabinet of Prime Minister Pierre Trudeau as Minister of Veterans Affairs. In 1972, he was appointed Minister of Public Works.

Dubé was dropped from Cabinet following the 1974 election, left Parliament the following year, and was named as a judge to the Federal Court of Canada, a position he held until his retirement in 2001.

Dubé died from natural causes on January 5, 2019. He was 92.

References

 

1926 births
2019 deaths
Acadian people
Liberal Party of Canada MPs
Members of the House of Commons of Canada from New Brunswick
Members of the King's Privy Council for Canada